Vilhelmina is a locality and the seat of Vilhelmina Municipality in Västerbotten County, province of Lapland, Sweden with 3,657 inhabitants in 2010.

Climate
Vilhelmina has a subarctic climate that is less severe than typical for a far inland locality at this latitude, but still very cold by Swedish standards. Its higher altitude causes summers to be cooler than coastal areas like Skellefteå further east, whereas winters are somewhat tempered by maritime air from the greater Atlantic and the North Atlantic Current.

References 

Municipal seats of Västerbotten County
Swedish municipal seats
Populated places in Västerbotten County
Populated places in Vilhelmina Municipality
Lapland (Sweden)

fi:Vilhelminan kunta